The Krzna  is a river in eastern Poland, a left tributary of The Bug. The river flows through Poland's Lublin Voivodeship. The Krzna arises from the connection of two water jets flowing in the Łuków Forest: Northern Krzna and Southern Krzna which is considered to be the beginning of the Krzna. The river empties to the Bug near the town of Terespol and the village of Neple, close to the Belarus border near, the city of Brest. A canal connects it to the Wieprz.

The Northern Krzna
The Northern Krzna is a short river which connects with the Southern Krzna in the town of Międzyrzec Podlaski. Similarly to the Southern Krzna, the river flows from Łuków Forests, center of which was formerly inaccessible Jata marsh and nowadays it is a wildlife reserve of the same name. The Northern Krzna is shorter than the Southern Krzna. However, its watershed area is bigger. During the Pleistocene epoch, the valley of the Northern Krzna was one of the routes of draining meltwater to the East. Nowadays, it drains the northern area of Łuków Plain, particularly the remainings of a sandur. From the Jata reserve to the village of Gołaszyn, the Northern Krzna is on the terrain of Łuków Park of Protected Landscape.

Features of the Krzna
The Krzna is a naturally meandering river, partially unbended by hydrolological processes which constantly change her original character. In the lower current, the water levels of the Krzna are strictly dependent on the Bug River. A characteristic feature of the Krzna are numerous oxbow lakes.

Tributaries
The most important tributaries of the Krzna are:
right tributaries: Dziegciarka, Rutka, Zielawa, Czapelka
left tributaries: Krzymosza, Piszczanka, Złota Krzywula, Klukówka

The most important towns located by the Krzna
Łuków (Southern Krzna), Międzyrzec Podlaski, Biała Podlaska

References

Rivers of Poland